Paraliparis hystrix is a species of fish in the family Liparidae (snailfish).

Description

It is white in colour with a black belly and tail.

Its specific name is from Ancient Greek ὕστριξ (hystrix), meaning "bristly." It has no common name in English, but is known in Danish as mørkhalet dybhavsringbug, "dark-tailed deep-sea seasnail."

Habitat

Paraliparis hystrix lives in the north Atlantic Ocean and in Canada's arctic waters off the Davis Strait.

References

Liparidae
Fish described in 1983
Taxa named by Nigel Merrett